'The Three Amigos is a series of 20 public service announcements (PSA) using three animated condoms to promote the use of safe sex as protection from contacting the HIV/AIDS virus. 

First shown at Bangkok's XV International AIDS Conference in 2004, the series was officially launched at the United Nations in 2005 in six languages. By 2012 it had been broadcast or used by non-governmental organizations, educational institutions, hospitals and others in 150 countries in 45 languages.

The series was co-created by Chocolate Moose Media's Firdaus Kharas and South African writer Brent Quinn. Episodes approach the subject with humor and are shown in 15-, 20-, 30- and 60-second animated spots. The hand-drawn animation series contains 14,000 drawings and was produced completely by volunteers in four countries.

The Three Amigos campaign won a Peabody Award in 2006 as well as 29 other international awards, and has been the subject of numerous articles and academic writing.  Distribution to all users throughout the world is free.

The campaign coincided with a significant decrease in new AIDS cases, according to UNAIDS statistics. Part of the result has come through staunch public support by people like Nobel Peace Prize laureate Archbishop Desmond Tutu.

References

External links
 The Three Amigos
 Firdaus Kharas

Public service announcements
HIV/AIDS prevention organizations